The Greater Essex County District School Board (known as English-language Public District School Board No. 9 prior to 1999) was created on January 1, 1998 with the amalgamation of the Windsor Board of Education and the Essex County Board of Education.  The school board services families in both Windsor, Ontario and Essex County, Ontario in Canada.

Schools
The Greater Essex County District School Board administers 14 secondary schools and 54 elementary schools.

Secondary

Belle River District High School
Essex District High School
Herman Academy - Secondary
Honourable W.C. Kennedy Collegiate
Kingsville District High School
Leamington District Secondary School
North Star High School
Riverside Secondary School
Sandwich Secondary School
Tecumseh Vista Academy - Secondary
Vincent Massey Secondary School
Walkerville Collegiate Institute
Walkerville Centre for the Creative Arts (located at Walkerville Collegiate Institute)
Westview Freedom Academy

Elementary
Elementary schools are Grades JK-8, unless otherwise noted:

A.V. Graham Public School
Amherstburg Public School
Anderdon Public School
Belle River Public School
Bellewood Public School
Centennial Central Public School
Central Public School
Colchester North Public School
Coronation Public School
D.M. Eagle Public School JK-6
David Maxwell Public School
Dr. David Suzuki Public School
Dougall Ave. Public School
East Mersea Public School
Eastview Horizon Public School
Essex Public School
F.W. Begley Public School
Ford City Public School
Forest Glade Public School
General Brock Public School
Glenwood Public School
Gore Hill Public School
Gosfield North Public School
Harrow Public School
Herman Academy
Hetherington Public School
Hugh Beaton Public School
Jack Miner Public School
James L. Dunn Public School
John Campbell Public School
John A. McWilliam Public School
King Edward Public School
Kingsville Public School
Lakeshore Discovery School
LaSalle Public School
Legacy Oak Trail Public School
Malden Central Public School
Margaret D. Bennie Public School
Marlborough Public School
Mt. Carmel – Blytheswood Public School
Northwood Public School
Pelee Island Public School
Prince Edward Public School
Princess Elizabeth Public School
Queen Elizabeth Public School
Queen Victoria Public School
Roseland Public School
Roseville Public School
Sandwich West Public School
Southwood Public School
Tecumseh Vista Academy
Talbot Trail Public School
West Gate Public School
Wm. G. Davis Public School

New Construction
Over the last few years, the Greater Essex County District School Board has received a number of grants from the Ministry of Education to replace older schools with new modern buildings.

James L. Dunn Public School
In November 2015 the Greater Essex County District School Board received a grant from the Ministry of Education of $15.23 million to build a permanent home for the Giles Campus French Immersion Public School. Giles Campus French Immersion Public School was created in 2011 at the former W. D. Lowe High School building to accommodate French Immersion students in the Northwest area of Windsor. This was a temporary solution due to demand for French Immersion programming in the city until a business case was approved to build a new school within the area. In January 2017 the GECDSB purchased a piece of property at 1123 Mercer Street. The former International Playing Card factory, a designated heritage building, will be preserved and included in the overall design of the new school. The new school construction began in July 2020 and opened in September 2022.

North Shore
In November 2015 the Greater Essex County District School Board was awarded a grant of $15.3 million for the construction of a new dual-track French Immersion / English school in the North Shore area. This will replace the current D.M. Eagle Public School and serve an area in Tecumseh and Lakeshore.

Kingsville JK-12
In April 2016, the Ministry of Education announced funding for a $44-million JK-to-Grade 12 school to be located in Kingsville.  The new school will consolidate students from Kingsville District High School, Harrow District High School, Kingsville Public School, and Jack Miner Public School, and may be the most expensive school the province has ever built. In 2021 the project was tendered over budget. In March 2022 the Ministry of Education announced the full $59-million to complete the project. The school is expected to open in September 2024.

North Star High School
In October 2016 the Ministry of Education awarded a $24.3 million grant for the construction of a new Amherstburg High School, which will consolidate the General Amherst HS and Western SS communities. The site of the new school is located at the south end of Centennial Park off Simcoe Street between Fryer Street and Victoria Street South which was sold to the school board from the Town of Amherstburg in January 2018. Construction began in October 2020 and opened in September 2022.

Legacy Oak Trail Public School
In October 2016 the Ministry of Education awarded a grant of $9,180,832 to build a replacement for Prince Andrew Public School in LaSalle, Ontario. In September 2018 land was acquired by the Board for the project on Leptis Magda Drive near the Vollmer Recreation Center. Construction began in June 2020 and was completed in September 2021.

Eastview Horizon Public School
In January 2018 the Ministry of Education had awarded a grant of $13.2 million to build a new elementary school in the Forest Glade area for 501 students with an additional 4 dedicated childcare classrooms. The new school will combine the existing Parkview Public School and Eastwood Public School communities into a new building on the existing Parkview School site. Construction began in May 2021 and is expected to open for Spring 2023.

Northwood Public School
In May 2022 the Ontario government announced $4.9 million to build an eight classroom addition at Northwood Public School which will add 184 new student spaces. The addition is expected to be open for September 2023.

See also 

Essex Tech Center
Windsor-Essex Catholic District School Board
List of school districts in Ontario
List of high schools in Ontario

References

External links
 Greater Essex County District School Board

School districts in Ontario
Organizations based in Windsor, Ontario
Education in Windsor, Ontario
1998 establishments in Ontario